Doryteuthis gahi, also known as the Patagonian longfin squid and Patagonian squid (Spanish: calamar patagónico), is a small-sized squid belonging to the family Loliginidae. It occurs in coastal waters in the southeastern Pacific Ocean and the southwestern Atlantic Ocean where it is caught and eaten for food.

Description
The mantle is somewhat elongated and on either side at the posterior end are rhomboidal fins, rather less than half the length of the mantle. At the anterior end are four pairs of arms and a pair of tentacles. The third and fourth pairs of arms are longer than the others, and in males, the left fourth arm is heterodactylised near its tip. The tentacles are long and slender, each terminated by a club-shaped "manus" with small, narrow suckers at the edge and slightly larger ones at the centre.

Distribution
This squid occurs in the southeastern Pacific Ocean and the southwestern Atlantic Ocean. In the Pacific, its range extends along the coast from southern Peru to southern Chile, and in the Atlantic, from the San Matías Gulf in Argentina southwards to Tierra del Fuego, including the continental shelf around the Falkland Islands.

Biology
Little is known of the biology of this species, but like all squid, it is a predator. Prey items are caught by the tentacles, grasped and moved to the mouth with the help of the arms, and then chewed by the horny beak. It is often a prey of Otaria flavescens, Alectis ciliaris and other predators.

Uses
In the Pacific Ocean and off Argentina, this species is mostly caught as bycatch during trawls directed at other species. There is a dedicated fishery in the Falkland Islands where it is an important target species taken from over the Patagonian Shelf.

References

Squid
Molluscs of the Atlantic Ocean
Molluscs of the Pacific Ocean
Cephalopods described in 1835
Taxa named by Alcide d'Orbigny